BNY Mellon Investment Management (BNY Mellon IM) is the investment management division of BNY Mellon. It is one of the largest asset managers in the world with $2.4 trillion in assets under management as of December 31, 2021. BNY IM uses seven different specialized investment managers, each with its own strategy and expertise to manage investments.

History 

In July 2007, BNY Mellon was created from the merger of the Bank of New York and Mellon Financial. The current entity, BNY Mellon Investment Management acts as the investment arm of BNY Mellon. In 2020, the Investment Management division contributed around 26% to BNY Mellon's fee revenue.

The investment firm Alcentra was part of the Bank of New York while Dreyfus, Newton and Walter Scott were part of Mellon Financial.

In 2007, BNY Mellon acquired Brazilian asset management firm, ARX Capital Management.

In 2009, BNY Mellon acquired Insight Investment from Lloyds Banking Group for £235m. In the same year BNY Mellon acquired a 20% stake in Siguler Guff.

In 2018, BNY Mellon IM merged three of its investment firms (Mellon Capital Management, Standish Mellon Asset Management and The Boston Company Asset Management) to form a new unit called Mellon Investments.

In 2019, BNY Mellon IM rebranded some of its fund range dropping the Newton, Insight brands and Dreyfus brand names from funds.

In 2020, BNY Mellon IM launched BNY Mellon Investor Solutions, an investment outsourcing services platform .

On May 31, 2022 it was announced that BNY Mellon IM would sell Alcentra to Franklin Templeton Investments and the transaction was completed on 1 November 2022.

Business overview 
Investors of BNY Mellon Investment Management include pension funds, public funds, endowments and foundations.

BNY Mellon Investment Management manages investments through seven different investment managers. They are

 ARX (Brazilian investments)
 Dreyfus (Money Market Funds and Offshore Liquidity Funds)
 Insight Investment (European investments)
 Mellon Investments (Global investments)
 Newton Investment Management (London-based global investment house)
 Siguler Guff (Multi-strategy private equity)
 Walter Scott (Global equities management)

In addition, BNY Mellon Investor Solutions provides investment outsourcing solutions.

BNY Mellon Investment Management is headquartered in New York with multiple offices across Europe and Asia-Pacific.

References

External links
Company home page

BNY Mellon
Investment management companies of the United States
Companies based in Manhattan